The Shackleton Limestone is a Cambrian limestone formation of the Byrd Group of Antarctica. The age of the formation is established to be Cambrian Stage 3, dated at ranging from 520 to 516 Ma. This period correlates with the End-Botomian mass extinction. Fossils of trilobites and Marocella mira and Dailyatia have been found in the formation, named after Ernest Shackleton, who led a failed expedition into Antarctica. At time of deposition, the Antarctic Plate has been established to be just south of the equator as part of the supercontinent Pannotia, contrasting with its present position at 82 degrees southern latitude.

Geology 
The formation, named by Laird in 1963, crops out in the Churchill Mountains, part of the Transantarctic Mountains of southwestern Antarctica. The most complete exposures are in the Holyoake Range. Paleontological data and carbon isotope stratigraphy indicate that the Shackleton Limestone ranges from lower Atdabanian through upper Botomian. The formation is a thick carbonate deposit with a lower unit of unfossiliferous interbedded quartzite and limestone, overlies the Late Proterozoic argillaceous turbidite Goldie Formation and underlies the Starshot Formation. Other lithologies noted in the Shackleton Limestone are marble with breccia, conglomerate, sandstone and shale. The abrupt transition from the Shackleton Limestone to a large-scale, upward coarsening siliciclastic succession records deepening of the outer platform and then deposition of an eastward-prograding molassic wedge. The various formations of the upper Byrd Group show general stratigraphic and age equivalence, such that coarse-grained alluvial fan deposits of the Douglas Conglomerate are proximal equivalents of the marginal-marine to shelf deposits of the Starshot Formation.

These beds are in fault contact with the adjacent Goldie Formation. The formation postdates the Beardmore Orogeny of the Neoproterozoic, and was deformed by the Ross Orogeny.

Fossil content 
The formation has provided fossils of trilobites such as Holyoakia granulosa, Pagetides (Discomesites) spinosus, Lemdadella antarcticae, Kingaspis (?) convexus, Yunnanocephalus longioccipitalis, and Onchocephalina (?) spinosa. Other fossils found are Marocella mira, and Dailyatia odyssei and D. braddocki.

See also 
 List of fossiliferous stratigraphic units in Antarctica
 Geology of Antarctica
 Fremouw Formation

References

Bibliography 
 
 
 
 
 
 

Geologic formations of Antarctica
Paleozoic Antarctica
Limestone formations
Sandstone formations
Shale formations
Conglomerate formations
Dolomite formations
Shallow marine deposits
Cambrian southern paleotropical deposits
Paleontology in Antarctica